Brett Douglas Pitman (born 31 January 1988) is a footballer who plays as a forward for AFC Portchester. He has spent most of his career at AFC Bournemouth in two separate spells, totalling 102 goals in 301 games. 

After starting his career on his native island, he moved to Bournemouth as a 16-year-old and went on to become a regular in their first team, helping them avoid relegation from The Football League in 2009 and earn promotion a year later. In August 2010, he moved to Championship side Bristol City.

In November 2012 he was loaned back to Bournemouth, until making the deal permanent in January 2013, and contributed to them winning the Football League Championship title in 2015. He then signed for Ipswich Town, then Portsmouth two years later.

Club career

Early career and AFC Bournemouth
Pitman was born in Saint Helier, Jersey, and began his football career in the Jersey Football Combination with local clubs First Tower United and St. Paul's. After scoring four goals for the island's under-18 team against AFC Bournemouth, he was signed by the Football League club and played in their youth team under Eddie Howe.

Pitman made his professional debut on 24 August 2005 in the second round of the Football League Cup, as a 114th-minute substitute for Stephen Cooke in a goalless draw away to Torquay United. Bournemouth won 4–3 on penalties. Three days later, he played his first league game, replacing Dani Rodrigues for the final two minutes of a 2–1 away win over Bradford City in League One. On 18 October, he scored his first goal for the Cherries in the Football League Trophy, a penalty to open a 4–1 win over Aldershot Town at Dean Court, and his sole league goal of 19 games that season was scored on 18 February 2006, in the fourth minute of a 1–1 home draw with Blackpool.

Pitman scored seven goals during the 2007–08 season, but was unable to prevent Bournemouth from being relegated to League Two. The following season, he was sent off just three minutes after he came on as a substitute in Bournemouth's FA Cup second round exit against non-league side Blyth Spartans. On 4 April 2009, he scored a hat-trick in a 4–0 home win over promotion-chasing Rochdale as Howe's Bournemouth gained points to retain their place in The Football League. He totalled 26 goals in 2009–10 as the Cherries won promotion back to League One, including one on 1 May 2010 as they sealed their promotion with a game remaining by defeating Port Vale 4–0.

Pitman scored a 16-minute hat-trick in the first home game of the 2010–11 season, a 5–1 win against Peterborough United on 14 August 2010. Three days later it was reported by Sky Sports News that newly promoted Premier League side Blackpool had made a bid of £400,000, possibly rising to £600,000, to sign him. The following day, it was reported that Bournemouth chairman Eddie Mitchell had blocked the bid and that the Seasiders had been prevented from opening talks with Pitman. Mitchell did not reveal the financial details of the offer but confirmed he had told Blackpool it was unacceptable. Later that same day, Bournemouth confirmed on their official website that they had accepted an offer from Blackpool and that personal terms were being discussed. On 19 August, Blackpool manager Ian Holloway confirmed that Pitman was having a medical with the club following talks with Holloway and the acting Chief Executive Karl Oyston. A day later it was confirmed that Pitman had failed to agree terms over the move to Blackpool after initial talks.

Bristol City
On 21 August 2010, Bristol City announced on their official site that they had agreed an undisclosed fee with Bournemouth and that Pitman, who had already agreed personal terms, would sign for them two days later subject to a medical. The fee was rumoured to be in the region of £1 million.

Pitman made his Championship debut eight days later, playing the full 90 minutes of a 2–0 loss at Ipswich Town. He partnered Jon Stead, and Sky Sports deemed his performance to be "quiet". Pitman did not score for the Robins until his 13th game on 20 November, when he came on at half time for Lee Johnson and opened a 2–0 win over Leicester City at Ashton Gate that moved his team out of the relegation zone. On 9 April 2012, he was sent off at the end of a 3–1 home win over Coventry City for a foul on Jordan Clarke.

Pitman totalled 20 goals in 81 games for City, but started only 36 of those games. Under the management of Derek McInnes, he started just 10 of 30. Pitman told BBC South Today that his work and goalscoring rate should have led to more starts.

Return to AFC Bournemouth
On 20 November 2012, Pitman returned to Bournemouth on a loan that would become a -year deal when the transfer window opened again in January, and reunited with Howe. Four days after his return, he came on as a 73rd-minute substitute for Matt Tubbs away to Bury and scored an added-time equaliser to ensure a 2–2 draw at Gigg Lane. On 26 January 2013, he scored all of the Cherries' goals in their 3–1 home win over Crewe Alexandra, two of which were penalties, and was substituted so that he could receive a standing ovation. He finished the season with a streak of nine goals across eight consecutive games, concluding on 20 April with one in a 3–1 home win over Carlisle United that won promotion to the Championship.

During the 2014–15 season Pitman helped Bournemouth win the Championship title and in doing so earn promotion to the Premier League for the first time in the club's 125-year history. He scored 13 goals across 34 league games, including a first-half hat-trick on 14 March 2015 in a 4–0 home win over Blackpool. He was praised by Howe for allowing Callum Wilson to take a penalty in the second half despite Pitman being the designated taker.

Ipswich Town
On 26 June 2015, Pitman remained in the Championship, joining Ipswich Town on a three-year deal. He made his debut on 11 August in a home game against Stevenage in the first round of the League Cup, assisting Jay Tabb's winner in a 2–1 victory. Eleven days later he scored his first goal for the Tractor Boys, heading Freddie Sears' cross to open a 2–1 away win over Preston North End. He scored 11 goals in his debut season at Ipswich, finishing the season as the team's top goalscorer.

He scored his first goal of the 2016–17 season on 9 September in a 2–1 loss to Reading. On 17 December he scored twice in a 3–2 away win over Wigan Athletic at the DW Stadium. Pitman struggled for regular game time during the season, making 23 appearances in all competitions and scoring 4 goals. On 10 May 2017, he was told that he was free to find a new club, despite having another year left on his contract.

Portsmouth
On 13 July 2017, Pitman signed a three-year deal with League One club, Portsmouth for an undisclosed fee. Manager Kenny Jackett gave him the captain's armband ahead of their return to the third tier of English football. He scored twice on his Portsmouth debut in a 2–0 home win over Rochdale on 5 August. He was named League One Player of the Month for September 2017, scoring six times in seven games.

Pitman finished his first season at Fratton Park as the league's second top scorer and Portsmouth F.C. top scorer with 25 goals across all competitions. Coming just behind Peterborough United's Jack Marriott in the league, he was the first Pompey player to pass 20 goals in a season since Svetoslav Todorov when the team won the 2002–03 Football League First Division.

In 2019–20, Pitman was stripped of his captaincy which was given to Tom Naylor in September and did not play past December. He was an unused substitute only five times for the rest of the season, was exiled from training and had to practice with Bournemouth's under-21 team to keep fit. He ended his Pompey career with 41 goals from 99 games.

Swindon Town
On 4 September 2020, Pitman signed for newly promoted League One club Swindon Town on a one-year deal. At the end of the season, the club triggered extensions to his and Jonathan Grounds's contracts, but after staff were not paid their wages for June, neither he nor Grounds turned up to pre-season training. On 30 July 2021 Pitman'contract was cancelled by mutual consent.

Bristol Rovers
On 30 July 2021 Pitman signed for League Two club Bristol Rovers on a one-year deal. On 18 September 2021, Pitman scored his first goal for the club with a consolation 92nd minute penalty in a 3–1 home defeat to Leyton Orient. On 29 January 2022, following a 1–0 home victory against Walsall, a match Pitman was not in the squad for, manager Joey Barton revealed that Pitman would be allowed to leave the club before the transfer deadline day two days later. Having spent the second half of the season away on loan, Pitman was released at the end of the season following Rovers' immediate promotion back to League One.

Eastleigh (loan)
On 3 February 2022, Pitman joined National League side Eastleigh on loan until the end of the 2021–22 season. Pitman made seventeen appearances for the club, scoring one goal in a 5–3 defeat to Solihull Moors.

AFC Portchester
Following his release from Bristol Rovers, Pitman joined Wessex League side AFC Portchester on a one-year deal, signing in a player/coach role. In January 2023, Pitman became the first player in the top nine tiers of English football to reach thirty goals, having scored thirty-six in all competitions.

International career
In November 2016, Pitman spoke of his desire to represent Jersey at international level if they become full UEFA members. Their membership had been rejected due to a new rule saying that members should be sovereign nations, brought in after the controversial admittance of Gibraltar in 2013.

Career statistics

Honours
AFC Bournemouth
Football League Championship: 2014–15
Football League One: 2012–13
Football League Two: 2009–10

Portsmouth
EFL Trophy: 2018–19

Individual
Football League Two Player of the Month: September 2009
Football/EFL League One Player of the Month: March 2013, September 2017

References

External links

AFC Bournemouth Vitalfootball profile
AFC Bournemouth official website profile

1988 births
Living people
People from Saint Helier
Jersey footballers
Association football forwards
AFC Bournemouth players
Bristol City F.C. players
Ipswich Town F.C. players
Portsmouth F.C. players
Swindon Town F.C. players
Bristol Rovers F.C. players
Eastleigh F.C. players
A.F.C. Portchester players
English Football League players
National League (English football) players
Wessex Football League players